Liliane Bert (1922-2015) was a French film and television actress.

Selected filmography
 The Blue Veil (1942)
 We Are Not Married (1946)
 Colonel Durand (1948)
 Sergil and the Dictator (1948)
 The Heroic Monsieur Boniface (1949)
 The Atomic Monsieur Placido (1950)
 The Dream of Andalusia (1951)
 Au diable la vertu (1954)
 Orient Express (1954)
 The Price of Love (1955)
 Voici le temps des assassins (1956)
 La Tour, prends garde ! (1958)

References

Bibliography
 Hayward, Susan. French Costume Drama of the 1950s: Fashioning Politics in Film. Intellect Books, 2010.

External links

1922 births
French film actresses
French stage actresses
French television actresses
Actresses from Paris
2015 deaths